The Institute of Health Sciences was established in 2005 by Lawrence Dann and his wife, Suzanne Laurie. The college offered numerous part-time and short courses such as nutritional therapy and nutrition coaching. 
This education facility offered students certificate and diploma courses for those wishing to pursue a career in nutritional sciences and health.
In December 2022, the college announced it’s closure after 17 years due to a downturn in student applications, leading to the college’s liquidation.

References
 The Irish Times Article
 Irish Independent Article

External links
 C103 Website
 Institute of Health Sciences

Medical and health organisations based in the Republic of Ireland